Elena Romero Barbosa (born 7 November 1907, d. 1996) was a Spanish composer born in Madrid. She also wrote professional articles on music. Selected works include:

Marcela (1957) chamber opera
Song of Turina

Her work has been recorded and issued on CD, including:
"Elena Romero: Integrale pour piano, by Alberto Portugheis" 10/8/2013
Twentieth-century Spanish Composers (20/10/2006)

References

1907 births
20th-century classical composers
Spanish women classical composers
Spanish classical composers
Jewish classical composers
1996 deaths
20th-century Spanish musicians
20th-century women composers